Need New Body is an avant garde music collective band from Philadelphia, Pennsylvania and beyond, numerous members of which have gone on to become members of the band Man Man. The band was formed from members of the defunct progressive rock/neo-psychedelic band Bent Leg Fatima.

Their sophomore album, UFO, was given the "Best New Music" designation by Pitchfork.

Members
Christopher Powell / Pow Pow – Drums
Tookie Sherman – Keyboard
Chris Reggiani – Bass
A.I. – Vocal, Banjo
Jamey Robinson – Piano
Jim Reggiani – Percussion
Griffin Rodriguez – Megabass
Larry D. Brown – Saxophone
Man Durphic – Aestheticist
Magic Ronston – Aestheticist

Discography

 Need New Body (2001, File Thirteen Records / Pickled Egg Records)
 UFO (2003, File Thirteen Records / Pickled Egg Records)
 Where's Black Ben? (2005, 5RC / Pickled Egg Records)

References

External links
[ All Music Entries]

American experimental musical groups